The Kalopedis Family are jewellers from Cyprus who specialize in traditional Greek Byzantine style icons and ecclesiastical art, found in Orthodox churches. Stylianos Kalopedis started the business in 1888 which has been passed down from father to son for five generations.  Their style incorporates cultural influences, both ancient and modern.

Kalopedis dynasty
Stylianos Kalopedis (1868–1936)
Giorgos Kalopedis I (1911–1984)
Michalakis Kalopedis I (born 1935)
Giorgos Kalopedis II (born 1958)
Michalis Kalopedis II (born 1980)

The establishment
Stylianos Kalopedis was born in 1868 at Lefkara, a mountain village on the island of Cyprus. As a child he was sent to the capital city of Nicosia to work at a workshop in the "street of the goldsmiths" and learn the art of jewellery making. When he was 20 years old his mentor told him that he had achieved a skill level with which he could open his own workshop. His mentor then provided him with a workbench and work tools. The year was 1888 and the family tradition had begun.

Stylianos at first had moved to the village of Vasa where he had met his wife and remained there for 15 years. When his family started growing he decided to move back to Nicosia. In October 1931 there was an uprising of the Cypriot people against the British colonists. To protect his family Stylianos moved them back to his birthplace Lefkara. He wanted to ensure he could pass down his skills and knowledge of the art that he was practicing to his children so that they would continue the profession.

The workshop at Lefkara was established and the Kalopedis family began to work on two categories of jewellery. The first category refers to  ecclesiastical art, such as icons, and other ecclesiastical instruments that are used in the Greek Orthodox Church. The family also was the first to introduce the two traditional Greek instruments "Kapnistiri" and "Mereha" to Cyprus, items which are used as censers in traditional weddings and other ceremonies. These two are what the parents and the priests use to bless their children on their wedding day. They are decorated in the forms of fruits such as apples and peaches. The "Kapnistiri" has two parts, one to store olive leaves and small charcoals and the other is for the burning of charcoals and olive leaves, to produce the smoke for the blessing. The "Mereha' is what is used to hold perfume. The second category in which the family specialized was personal jewellery.

All the items at the beginning were made with silver although for a short period due to the bad economic situations in Cyprus; copper was used in the place of silver. After the crisis passed the family returned to the use of silver for all ecclesiastic and other decorative items and gold was then also introduced for personal jewellery.

Giorgos Kalopedis I, one of Stylianos’ sons, in 1943 saw a promising future in the town of Larnaca so in 1944 he left the village of Lefkara and moved to Larnaca, taking with him his family.

Giorgos Kalopedis I was a business man, he took the first steps in taking the business of the family outside the borders of Cyprus. In Larnaca Giorgos Kalopedis I, became an attraction for locals, visitors and tourists because he brought his art to the street. He worked on a table that was placed on the pavement outside his store, where people could watch his art in the making.

Andreas kalopedis the brother of Michalakis Kalopedis I, has worked on icons such as the one of Mary in the church located in the village of Kiti, outside the town of Larnaca. Today Michalakis Kalopedis I, George Kalopedis II and Michael Kalopedis II represent the three generations that continue the tradition of the family.

Important works
Some of the most important religious places for which the family has created pieces for are the monasteries of Athos Mountain in Greece, the monastery of Stavrovouni and the three Churches of Holy Mary at the village of Kivisili.

The silver cross that was made for the monastery of Staurovouni is one of the significant pieces made by the family since the monastery is one of the most hallowed places in the Christian faith. It is the monastery which according to a religious tradition was founded by St. Helena, the mother of the Byzantine Emperor Constantine I, the Great. She had discovered the three crosses on which Jesus and the two thieves had been crucified on her visit to the Holy Land. On her way back to Constantinople, she left a piece of the Holy Cross of Jesus at this monastery. The jewellers of the family were asked to create a silver cross where in its center the piece of the holy cross of Jesus was placed. The silver cross is decorated with hammering with an image representing the moment of the resurrection and images and representations of saints and apostles.

In 1981 a silver icon for the church of Holy Mary at the village of Kivissili was made. The icon is one of the most elaborately decorated icons made by the Kalopedis family. The icon was made to cover an existing painting. The silver icon however does not cover the face of Mary and Jesus. These are left uncovered so that their iconographical image can be displayed. One day a Turkish man, one of the many that used to live in the village, had walked into this Greek Orthodox Church and stubbed the icon of Mary in the left eye. As a result the man permanently lost his vision. The mark is still visible today.

Other icons made by the family are works for the church of St. Savvas at the village of Leivadia, outside the town of Larnaca.

External links
Official website
Passing down the Byzantine tradition. A documentary on the making of Byzantine silver icons

Greek Cypriot artists
Cypriot families
Eastern Orthodox icons